GO Expansion, previously known as GO Regional Express Rail (RER), is a project to improve GO Transit train service by adding all-day, two-way service to the inner portions of the Barrie line, Kitchener line and the Stouffville line, and by increasing frequency of train service on various lines to every 15 minutes or better on five of the corridors. This would be achieved with the electrification of at least part of the Lakeshore East line, Lakeshore West line, Barrie line, Kitchener line and Stouffville line. GO Expansion is one of the Big Move rapid transit projects.

With GO Expansion, GO Transit will increase the number of train trips per week from 1,500 (as of 2015) to about 2,200 by 2020 and expand to 10,500 weekly trips upon completion. Most of the extra trips will be in off-peak hours and on weekends. The expanded services, new infrastructure and electrification is projected to roll out in phases between 2025 and 2030. The 10-year regional express rail plan will cost $13.5 billion and will require  of new track, including new bridges and tunnels.

History

Background 
GO Transit has historically offered two-way, all-day service along its Lakeshore East and Lakeshore West lines, while only providing peak rush hour service on its other lines. The Big Move outlined the building of express and regional rail service improvements across the existing GO Transit network. Other improvements included extensions to Hamilton and Bowmanville, as well as new GO Transit corridors to Bolton, Seaton and Locust Hill.

As part of the 2011 Ontario general election, Ontario premier Dalton McGuinty also made a campaign pledge to provide two-way, all-day train service on all corridors. This vision of two-way, full-day train service on all corridors eventually included electrification of the system and was renamed Regional Express Rail.

As part of the Phase 2 announcement, Metrolinx stated that the Kitchener and Lakeshore lines would be electrified, as well as the Union Pearson Express.

With GO Expansion, Metrolinx expects to nearly triple ridership to 175 million riders per year by about 2031 from 65.7 million in 2015.

GO Expansion 
On March 31, 2017, the federal government announced it would contribute $1.9 billion of the estimated $13.5 billion cost of GO Expansion. The Kitchener line will receive at least $750 million of the federal funding for infrastructure upgrades including  of new track.

On February 23, 2022, Metrolinx announced that the preferred bidder for the contract was ONxpress Transportation Partners, a consortium that includes Aecon, FCC Construcción, Alstom, and Deutsche Bahn, among others. Under its $1.6-billion contract, ONxpress will complete Phase 1 of the GO Expansion project, which includes designing key infrastructure such as signalling systems and upgrades to Hydro One power infrastructure. Phase 1 also includes determining the full scope of the project. The consortium will also start construction for grade separations at rail and road crossings.

The contract was finalized on April 19, 2022; Alstom announced it will be implementing the European Rail Traffic Management System for the signalling on the upgraded network, the first use of that standard in North America.

Electrification

GO Expansion goals would be achieved with the electrification of core sections of the GO Transit train system while also expanding the use of diesel service in others, as follows:
 The Lakeshore West line between Aldershot  and Union Station
 The Lakeshore East line between Oshawa and Union Station
 The Kitchener line between Bramalea and Union Station, including the Union Pearson Express service
 The Barrie line between Allandale Waterfront (Barrie) and Union Station
 The Stouffville line between Old Elm and Union Station

With electrification, service on the Lakeshore West line could possibly be as frequent as every three-and-a-half minutes during peak periods.

GO Expansion will operate 4-car, bi-level electric multiple unit (EMU) sets which would be coupled to form 8- and 12-car trains. To reduce operating costs, smaller 4-car trains will run during periods of lighter demand, such as on weekends. GO Transit's existing fleet of unpowered bi-level cars will be used to operate many peak services but will be pulled by electric locomotives, in a similar manner to SEPTA Regional Rail. EMUs cost less to operate than 12-car diesel trains and have faster acceleration. Journey times can be reduced significantly with electric traction depending on the route, stopping pattern, and equipment. Because electric trains can accelerate and decelerate faster at stations, trip times could be reduced on average by 10 minutes with a maximum reduction of up to 20 to 30 minutes.

Proposed frequencies
In 2022, Metrolinx estimated that with GO Expansion, GO Transit would have the ability to run up to three times more trains than the 3,500 trains per week it ran in 2019. The busiest routes could operate between 8 and 18 trains per hour. Trains at GO stations such as Exhibition, Bloor and East Harbour could have a frequency of every 3 minutes and a 5-minute frequency at stations such as Burlington and Pickering. Evening and weekend service could be as frequent as every 6 to 15 minutes. The following more modest frequencies were projected in 2015.

Two-way all-day service 
GO Expansion will see many sections of GO train lines receiving two-way all-day service. Sections proposed to get two-way all-day 15-minute or better are:
 Lakeshore West line between Burlington and Union Station
 Lakeshore East line between Oshawa and Union Station
 Kitchener line between Bramalea and Union Station
 Barrie line between Bradford and Union Station
 Stouffville line between Unionville and Union Station

Sections proposed to get two-way all-day 30-minute service are:
 Kitchener line between Mount Pleasant and Union Station (every 15 minutes in peak period)

Sections proposed to get two-way all-day 60-minute service are:
 Lakeshore West line between West Harbour and Union Station (already in effect since August 7, 2021)
 Lakeshore West line between Hamilton GO Centre and Union Station
 Kitchener line between Kitchener and Union Station (every 30 minutes in peak period)
 Barrie line between Allandale Waterfront (Barrie) and Union Station
 Stouffville line between Mount Joy (Markham) and Union Station

Peak direction service 
Go Expansion will also see more frequent weekday, peak-direction service on the following routes:
 Every 15 minutes on the Lakeshore West line between Hamilton GO Centre and Union Station
 Every 15 minutes on the Milton line
 Every 30 minutes on the Barrie line between Allandale Waterfront (Barrie) and Union Station
 Every 15 minutes on the Richmond Hill line
 Every 20 minutes on the Stouffville line between Old Elm and Union Station

Express service 
Stations between Oakville and Hamilton on the Lakeshore West line, between Bramalea and Kitchener on the Kitchener line, and between Pickering and Oshawa on the Lakeshore East line are proposed to receive express service to and from Union Station.

Signalling
As part of GO Expansion, Metrolinx will deploy ERTMS level 1 in order to provide more frequent service, marking the first implementation of ERTMS in North America.

New stations

SmartTrack 

SmartTrack started out as a proposed Regional Express Rail surface service to run mostly within the City of Toronto. It was proposed by John Tory during his successful mayoral campaign in 2014. The SmartTrack proposal depends on electrification of the Stouffville and Kitchener corridors where SmartTrack service would run.

See also
 Electrification of Caltrain
 Réseau Express Régional
 Moscow Central Diameters
 South Wales Metro
 S-train

References

External links
 Metrolinx GO Expansion project site
 GO Expansion Initial Business Case:
 Summary
 Full Report
 Appendices A-J
 A: Corridor Specifications
 B: Corridor and System Schematics
 C: Model Assumptions and Results
 D: Record of Assumptions – Direct Demand Model
 E: Financial Performance of GO Expansion Systems
 F: Sensitivity Analysis
 G: Wider Economic Benefits
 H: Line Speed Analysis
 I: Environmental Assessment Program
 J: Fare Structure Issues and Solutions
 Appendix K: Station Access Analysis

Metrolinx
Transportation planning
Transport in Toronto
Transport in the Greater Toronto Area
The Big Move projects
Railway electrification in Canada
Proposed public transport in the Greater Toronto Area